is a 2019 Japanese anime film produced by Shin-Ei Animation. It is the 27th film of the popular comedy manga and anime series Crayon Shin-chan. The director is Masakazu Hashimoto, who also directed the 21st movie Crayon Shin-chan: Very Tasty! B-class Gourmet Survival!!, the 23rd movie Crayon Shin-chan: My Moving Story! Cactus Large Attack! and the 25th movie Crayon Shin-chan: Invasion!! Alien Shiriri. The screenplay was written by Kimiko Ueno who also wrote for the 2015 movie Crayon Shin-chan: My Moving Story! Cactus Large Attack! and the 2018 movie Crayon Shin-chan: Burst Serving! Kung Fu Boys ~Ramen Rebellion~.

This is the last Heisei-era Crayon Shin-chan movie, released weeks before the 2019 Japanese imperial transition.This is the first Crayon Shin-chan film to feature Yumiko Kobayashi as Shinnosuke Nohara since July 6, 2018. This is final Crayon Shin-chan film to be distributed by Odex in Singapore, Malaysia and Brunei
before Crayon Shin-chan's film rights were transitioned to Taiwan-based Company Muse Communication in 2020.

Plot
Hiroshi and Misae have never been to a honeymoon trip to a foreign country. One day, Misae discovered an inexpensive and family-friendly holiday package to Australia and the Nohara family decided to make it their first honeymoon vacation.

Hiroshi gets kidnapped upon arrival to Australia, leaving Shinnosuke, Misae and others on a dangerous journey. It turns out that Hiroshi is the key to a secret treasure. The remaining members of the Nohara Family must rescue Hiroshi, while a mysterious masked man and treasure hunters from all over the world are after him. The struggle is among three different groups in this action-filled treasure hunting adventure.

The plot is slightly similar to the 1994 movie Crayon Shin-chan: The Hidden Treasure of the Buri Buri Kingdom, including the concepts of "cheap foreign trip", "getting kidnapped and chased", and "key to treasure". In that movie, Misae had won a holiday package to Buri Buri Kingdom, Shinnosuke who gets kidnapped was the key to the secret treasure of that kingdom, and the family was chased by treasure hunters.

Cast 
 Yumiko Kobayashi as Shinnosuke Nohara  
 Miki Narahashi as Misae Nohara
 Toshiyuki Morikawa as Hiroshi Nohara
 Satomi Korogi as Himawari Nohara
 Mari Mashiba as Shiro

Box Office
The film sold 242,000 tickets and earned 289 million yen (about US$2.58 million) to rank at #3 in its opening weekend. By Seventh Weekend, the Film dropped out of the top 10 and earned overall total of 1,978,810,800 yen (about US$18.33 million) from Japan Box Office.

Trivia
The film is Yumiko Kobayashi's first for the franchise in the title role. She took over the role of protagonist Shinnosuke Nohara in the television anime last July after previous voice actress Akiko Yajima departed from the role.
On Television premiere, The Film aired on TV Asahi on Saturday, September 12 at 6:56 p.m. and it earned a 4.4% rating.

See also
 List of Crayon Shin-chan films

References

External links 
 

2019 anime films
2019 films
Honeymoon Hurricane ~The Lost Hiroshi~
Toho animated films
Films set in Australia